Forze is a hydrogen electric vehicle racing team. It is run by students and was founded at the Delft University of Technology in 2007 by Edgar van Os and has built 8 hydrogen fuel cell racing vehicles. The team's offices and workshops are located at the Schiehal in Delft. In 2007, the team began designing and building go-karts with a hydrogen-electric drivetrain. With these vehicles they participated in the Formula Zero competition, hence the name ForZe. After five years the first full-size hydrogen race car was built, the Forze VI. Another three years later the project of the Forze VII began. This became the first hydrogen-electric racecar to ever participate in an official race against fossil-fueled vehicles. The latest iteration, the Forze VIII, was the first hydrogen-electric race car to ever beat petrol powered cars, and came in 2nd place at the Gamma Racing Days in Assen in 2019. Over the coming years the team wants to develop its cars in such a way that they can compete in a Le Mans Prototype endurance series.

Hydrogen 
In a conventional road car, the energy that is stored in fuel is converted to mechanical energy, using the principle of combustion. The cars that are built by Forze utilize a different concept. The hydrogen fuel cell system inside the vehicles converts the energy stored in hydrogen to electric energy. This means that the fuel cell system can be used to power an electric drive train with hydrogen as a so-called alternative fuel.

The efficiency of the fuel conversion can be about two to three times higher than a conventional combustion engine. The most obvious differences of hydrogen-electric vehicles compared to their battery-electric relatives is the time required to recharge or refill, and the driving range. Hydrogen tanks can be refilled within minutes whereas batteries currently take several hours to recharge. This makes hydrogen-electric propulsion ideal for applications where non-stop operation and/or a long driving range is required.

The mission of Forze is to promote fuel cell technology by educating their own team members, but also the general public and to inspire industries to use hydrogen technology. By designing and building their own high performance hydrogen race cars, the potential and application of hydrogen can be demonstrated. Currently, Forze is still the only student team worldwide that uses high power automotive fuel cells.

Cars & Competitions

Formula Zero

The team started competing in the 2008 Formula Zero Championship, the world's first hydrogen fuel cell championship. Given the importance of the upcoming Hydrogen economy and considering climate change and oil related problems, the project draws a lot of attention from international media.

The first season was limited to one event in the inner city of Rotterdam next to the Erasmus Bridge.
The second season consisted of a European Cup and a separate Grand Prix in the city center of Turin. 
The third season again only had one race, held the center of The Hague.

Formula Student
The Formula Zero competition did not prove to grow into what it promised to be during the first years. 
The team continued to innovate and moved on to the Formula Student competition. The Forze IV and V vehicles were purpose built for this competition. To this day, Forze is still the only student team that has competed with a fuel cell powered kart.

Going Big 
After competing in the Formula Student race twice, Forze made a big step towards the professional racing world. The next car, the Forze VI, became world's first full-size race car powered by hydrogen. Due to the lack of a FIA license for the Forze VI, registering for official races was difficult, and the car did not compete in any FIA backed competitions. To avoid this problem, the Forze VII featured an FIA licensed LMP3-monocoque from ADESS AG. With it, the team built the first hydrogen race car ever to compete against fossil fueled combustion vehicles in an official race. The Forze VII competed in the Supercar Challenge in 2017 during the Gamma Racing Days on the TT Circuit Assen. In the 45-minute race, the Forze VII set the third fastest laptime in the Sports division, showing its potential. Unfortunately though, the hydrogen-electric race car was not able to drive the full race as it only had fuel on board for 30 minutes. 

One year later, in 2018, the Forze VIII drove the full 60-minute race at the Supercar Challenge 2018 during the Gamma Racing Days on TT Circuit Assen. In August 2019, the Forze VIII competed in the same race and came in second place in the sports division. This success was nothing the world had ever seen before.

Currently, the team is working on designing and building the Forze IX, with which they hope to compete in higher divisions of the Supercar Challenge.

Competition results

World Records 
The team made several official and unofficial world records attempts to beat the FIA world land speed record for hydrogen powered fuel cell cars under 500 kg on the 1/8th mile.
On 3 October 2010 the team tried to break the world record held by the Formula Zero Mark II at 11.2 seconds.
This attempt took place on the island of Aruba on the Palo Marga International Raceway Park.
Unfortunately due to heavy rain part of the island flooded and the attempt was pushed to 4 October. In a much smaller time frame with little time to prepare the vehicle for racing, the team managed to set a time of 9.77 seconds.

On 16 August 2011, the team organized an official attempt on the Princess Beatrixlaan in the center of The Hague.
With the help of the Dutch national autosport federation (KNAF) a licensed track to FIA standards was put up. The Forze IV hydrogen vehicle drove a time of 10.45 seconds that day. After several months the FIA ruled that this measured time was not an official land speed record because of an error in the documents submitted by KNAF to the FIA.

In May 2015, the team took the Forze VI to the Nürburgring Nordschleife. With ex-formula 1 driver Jan Lammers they broke the fuel cell lap record by over a minute, which was previously owned by the Nissan FCV X-Trail concept. Lammers accomplished a time of 10:42.58. This time still stands as the fastest fuel cell laptime today. 
  
On 17 December 2015, the full-size Forze VI obtained the fastest electric lap record on Circuit Zandvoort with driver and also team member Kevin Schreiber behind the wheel. With a lap time of 2:04.519 the Forze VI has beaten the Tesla Roadster, which was the previous electric lap record holder on the famous Dutch race track. On 4 June 2017 Forze lost the record to InMotion.

Team

All members of the team are both bachelor and master TU Delft students from a wide range of faculties, including aerospace engineering, mechanical engineering and electrical engineering. The size of the team has grown over the years and has varied from forty to sixty students in the last few years. As of October 2020, the 14th team consists of 25 full-time members and is backed by nearly 25 part-timers.

Board

Drivers 
During the third season a new team member with karting experience became the third driver for the team. The driver, Charlie van der Schoor, was also more closely involved with the development of the Forze III. In season 4 the team said farewell to Martin Buitelaar as a driver. He was no longer a student and took on a full-time job outside the racing industry. For season 4 the team raced in the Formula Student (UK) competition and therefore needed more drivers to be able to compete in all the events. A selection among the team members was organised by Buitelaar where Marco van't Wout, Arie Nap and Lennert van den Boom were selected. For the 6th season only licensed race car drivers were allowed due to the increased performance of the car.

Sponsors
As a foundation Forze is completely dependent on its sponsors. Sponsors provide the team with software, materials, equipment or financial support. As of March 2022, Shell is the main sponsor of Forze. A list of sponsors of the team can be found on the website of Forze:

References

External links
 Forze Delft - Homepage
 Formula Zero Greenchoice Forze page
 Official Website 
 Hydrogen-powered cars meet in championship race
 Green tech in 'Formula Zero' race

Fuel cell vehicles
Kart racing
Forze Delft
Electric drag racing
Electric vehicles in the Netherlands
Auto racing teams established in 2007
Dutch auto racing teams
Dutch racecar constructors